Erminio Spalla (7 July 1897 – 14 August 1971) was an Italian professional heavyweight boxer, film actor and singer.

Spalla studied fine arts in Brera, when in 1910 he saw film footage of the world boxing championships and decided to become a professional boxer.
He was the first Italian to win a European boxing title, which he did in 1923. He lost it in 1926 to Paulino Uzcudun and retired from boxing the next year, though he briefly returned to the ring in 1934 and won all three of his final bouts.  He returned to art after retiring from the ring.

In October 1937 he debuted as an opera singer in Nel Trovatore in Turin. In the same year he also worked in sculpture and painting.

In 1939 he acted in his first film, Io, suo padre by Mario Bonnard. This was followed by over fifty films and television series, including the war film Giarabub (1942). His last film was I fratelli Karamazov by Sandro Bolchi (1969).

His elder brother Giuseppe was also a boxer.

Selected filmography

 Il match dei 100.000 dollari (1921)
 I, His Father (1939) - Romolo Tonelli
 The Silent Partner (1939) - Il colonello
 Il signore della taverna (1940)
 Il ponte dei sospiri (1940) - Scalabrino
 La compagnia della teppa (1941) - L'oste Bartolomeo Borghi
 The Hero of Venice (1941) - Franco
 Capitan Tempesta (1942) - El Kadur
 The Lion of Damascus (1942) - El Kadur
 Arriviamo noi! (1942) - Il terzo gestorio del "castello delle streghe"
 Giarabub (1942) - Il meccanico "Mago Bakù" Brambilla
 I due Foscari (1942) - Oliviero
 Il fanciullo del West (1942) - Il fattore dei Carey
 Knights of the Desert (1942)
 The Champion (1943) - Mario Martini
 Harlem (1943) - Franckie Battaglia, l'allenatore
 Romulus and the Sabines (1945) - Giovanni, il carrettiere
 Senza famiglia (1946) - Vitali
 Ogni giorno è domenica (1946) - Stefano
 The Devil's Gondola (1946) - Marco, il gondoliere
 The Tyrant of Padua (1946) - Un evaso
 Sangue a Ca' Foscari (1946)
 The Opium Den (1947)
 The Adventures of Pinocchio (1947) - Mangiafuoco
 Cab Number 13 (1948) - Le marin
 Fabíola (1949)
 The Pirates of Capri (1949)
 Flying Squadron (1949)
 Santo disonore (1950) - Oreste
 Deported (1950) - Benjamino Barda
 Bluebeard's Six Wives (1950) - L'Autista
 Miracle in Milan (1951) - Gaetano
 O Comprador de Fazendas (1951)
 A Flea on the Scales (1953)
 A Família Lero-Lero (1953)
 Lights Out (1953)
 Chéri-Bibi (1955) - Il rosso
 The Red Cloak (1955)
 Io piaccio (1955) - Man who abducts Roberto Maldi (uncredited)
 Torna piccina mia! (1955) - Zoras
 Vendicata! (1956)
 Wives and Obscurities (1956) - Oste
 A Estrada (1956)
 Poveri ma belli (1957) - Amico del padre di Giovanna
 Addio sogni di gloria (1957)
 Song of Naples (1957) - Docker
 Solo Dio mi fermerà (1957)
 Il Conte di Matera (1958) - Amico di Golia
 Angel in a Taxi (1958) - Un saltimbanco
 The Naked Maja (1958) - Rojas (the Innkeeper)
 The Defeated Victor (1959) - Coach (allenatore)
 The Pirate and the Slave Girl (1959) - Malik
 Agosto, donne mie non vi conosco (1959)
 Il Mattatore (1960) - Un detenuto (uncredited)
 Siege of Syracuse (1960) - Taverniere (uncredited)
 Minotaur, the Wild Beast of Crete (1960) - Padre Addottivo di Arianna
 The Prisoner of the Iron Mask (1961)
 The Fury of Achilles (1962) - Nestor
 Taur, il re della forza bruta (1963) - Re di Shrupuk
 The Sailor from Gibraltar (1967) - Eolo

References

External links

1897 births
1971 deaths
Sportspeople from the Province of Alessandria
Italian male film actors
20th-century Italian male actors
Italian male boxers
Heavyweight boxers